HMS Trollope (K575) was a British Captain class frigate of the Royal Navy in commission during World War II. Originally constructed as a United States Navy Buckley class destroyer escort, she served in the Royal Navy from January to July 1944, when she was lost.

Construction and transfer
The ship was laid down as the unnamed U.S. Navy destroyer escort DE-566 by Bethlehem-Hingham Shipyard, Inc., in Hingham, Massachusetts, on 29 September 1943 and launched on 20 November 1943. She was transferred to the Royal Navy upon completion on 10 January 1944.

Service history

Commissioned into service in the Royal Navy  as the frigate HMS Trollope (K575) on 10 January 1944 simultaneously with her transfer, the ship served on patrol and escort duty in the English Channel and supported the invasion of Normandy.

On 6 July 1944, Trollope either ran aground near Arromanches-les-Bains, France, or was torpedoed by a German S-boat – known to the Allies as "E-boat" – motor torpedo boat off Cap d'Antifer, France, according to different sources.

At approximately 01:30 on 6 July 1944, Trollope was struck by 3 torpedoes launched by a German E-boat, breaking the vessel in two. The front part of the vessel detached and drifted, presenting a risk to other Allied vessels in the area. This was sunk, tactically, by Allied forces. The rear of the vessel was towed towards Arromanches-les-Bains by a US tug boat, where it was run aground allowing servicemen still on board to be rescued. Source of this information was from one of those servicemen rescued.

Trollope was declared a constructive total loss. The Royal Navy returned her to the U.S. Navy on 10 October 1944.

Disposal
The U.S. Navy struck Trollope from its Naval Vessel Register on 13 November 1944. She was sold on 9 January 1947 to John Lee of Belfast, Northern Ireland, for scrapping, and was scrapped in Scotland in 1951.

References

Navsource Online: Destroyer Escort Photo Archive Trollope (DE-566) HMS Trollope (K-575)
uboat.net HMS Trollope (K 575)
Destroyer Escort Sailors Association DEs for UK
Captain Class Frigate Association HMS Trollope K575 (DE 566)

External links
Photo gallery of HMS Trollope (K575)

 

Captain-class frigates
Buckley-class destroyer escorts
World War II frigates of the United Kingdom
Ships built in Hingham, Massachusetts
1943 ships
Maritime incidents in July 1944